Central Stadium Shakhtar is a multi-purpose stadium that is located in the Shcherbakov Central Park, in Voroshylovskyi District, Donetsk, Ukraine. The stadium has a capacity of 31,718. Shakhtar Stadium was the primary home ground for Shakhtar Donetsk and a major football arena in Ukraine until the early 2000s.

Description
The stadium was built in 1936 specifically for Shakhtar (Stakhanovets) Stalino with the most recent reconstruction in 2000. It is located in the central city's park near a big pond. The park itself is located on a border of Kuibyshevskyi, Leninskyi and Voroshylovskyi districts.

1995 explosion
On 15 October 1995, soon after the start of a football match between Shakhtar and Tavriya, a large explosion killed several people, including the local criminal Akhat Bragin and his security consisting of five men, all of whom died instantly. None of the 2,000 stadium's spectators suffered any injuries, but a buffet waitress was taken to a hospital in critical condition. Due to the explosion the game was interrupted and postponed for two weeks being rescheduled for 31 October 1995. Russian newsmedia informed that Bragin had purchased control of FC Shakhtar Donetsk in 1994; Bragin had survived two previous assassination attempts involving automatic rifles. After the explosion, a special investigative commission was organized, consisting of various agencies including Ministry of Internal Affairs, Security Service of Ukraine, and General Prosecutor Office of Ukraine. The stadium did not function as a sports facility for several years, a local radio market being established there instead.

Further plans
In 2010-11, the general director of Shakhtar Serhiy Palkin announced that the stadium would be rebuilt in its original architecture of 1936, however due to the UEFA Euro 2012 and later the 2014 war in Donbass that idea became abandoned.

Games of the Ukraine national football team

See also
 Yevhen Shcherban

References

External links
 Stadium website
 Shakhtar Stadium: photo-evolution (Стадион “Шахтер”: фотоэволюция). Donjetskiy. 16 March 2012

Football venues in Donetsk Oblast
Sports venues built in the Soviet Union
Sport in Donetsk
Multi-purpose stadiums in Ukraine
Buildings and structures in Donetsk
Sports venues in Donetsk Oblast

October 1995 crimes
Disasters in Donetsk Oblast
Disasters in sports
Explosions in 1995
Massacres in Ukraine
Murder in Donetsk Oblast
1995 murders in Ukraine
Politics and sports
Sports-related accidents and incidents
Terrorist incidents in Donetsk Oblast
Mass murder in 1995
October 1995 events in Europe
Terrorist incidents in Europe in 1995
Terrorist incidents in Ukraine in the 1990s